Principe Domnitor (Romanian pl. Principi Domnitori) was the official title of the ruler of Romania between 1862 and 1881.  It was usually translated as "prince regnant" in other languages and less often as "grand duke". "Domnitor" it’s an adjective derived from the Romanian word "domn" (lord or ruler) and, in turn, from the Latin "Dominus". The title "Domn" had been in use since the Middle Ages and it is also the Romanian equivalent to the Slavic "Hospodar". Moldavian and Wallachian rulers had used this term for their title of authority as the head of state, while "voievod" represented the military rank as the head of the army.

The title acquired an officially recognized meaning after Moldavia and Wallachia united to form the Romanian United Principalities under Alexander John I, who had become the ruler of both states since 1859. Alexander John abdicated in 1866 and was succeeded by Carol I, who promulgated the first constitution who officially used the name Romania for the country. He held the title until 1881. When Romania was proclaimed a kingdom in March 1881, Carol became its first king.

Domnitori of the United Principalities (1862–1881)

Timeline of the lifespans of Domnitors 
This is a graphical lifespan timeline of Domnitors of Romania.  The domnitors are listed in order of office.

See also
King of the Romanians
List of rulers of Moldavia
List of rulers of Wallachia
List of heads of state of Romania

References

Romanian monarchs
Romanian words and phrases
Titles of national or ethnic leadership
1862 establishments in Romania
1881 disestablishments in Romania